Gilt may refer to:

Gilt, a young female domestic pig
Gilding, the application of a thin layer of precious metal
Gilt-edged securities, government bonds
Gilt (album), an album by Machines of Loving Grace
Gilt Groupe, a shopping website
Gilt darter, Percina evides,  a small freshwater fish
 Internationalization and localization, a computing process sometimes referred to as GILT (for "globalization, internationalization, localization and translation")

See also
 Guilt (disambiguation)